The Rothmans/Daily Express Spring Trophy was a non-championship Formula One race held on 9 April 1971 at Oulton Park.

Only twelve cars took part. Team Lotus entered three different chassis types - a 49C, a 72D and the Pratt & Whitney gas-turbine-engined 56B. Local favourite and Formula 3 driver Cyd Williams was entrusted with a
Frank Williams Racing Cars March but crashed heavily during untimed practice and did not start the race.
Jackie Stewart set pole position in the spare car but in the race itself he struggled with his regular car's handling. Pedro Rodriguez won ahead of Peter Gethin, the two of them sharing fastest lap. Stewart finished third.

Classification

Qualifying

Race

1 Stewart practiced in the spare Tyrrell 002 but opted to race Tyrrell 001.

References

1971 Formula One races